Acherontia may refer to:
 Acherontia (city), a city in ancient Apulia, Italy
 Acherontia (moth), three species in the genus Acherontia
 Acherontia atropos
 Acherontia lachesis
 Acherontia styx
Acherontia (film), a 1972 Mexican film